Thomas Duncan Pollock (March 1929–fl.2006), known as Duncan Pollock, was a unionist politician in Northern Ireland.

Biography
Born in Castlederg in County Tyrone, Pollock studied at Omagh Academy before becoming a farmer. In the mid-1950s, he was Chief Organiser of the Young Farmers' Clubs of Northern Ireland. He joined the Ulster Unionist Party (UUP) and was elected to Castlederg Rural District Council in 1967, serving until it was disbanded in 1973. He was also elected to the executive of the UUP.

At the 1973 Northern Ireland Assembly election, Pollock was elected in Mid Ulster, but by the Northern Ireland Constitutional Convention in 1975, he had joined the Unionist Party of Northern Ireland split and lost his seat.

In his spare time, Pollock enjoyed playing football and table tennis, and was active in the Presbyterian Church.

References

1929 births
Possibly living people
Members of the Northern Ireland Assembly 1973–1974
Politicians from County Tyrone
Ulster Unionist Party councillors
Unionist Party of Northern Ireland politicians
Farmers from Northern Ireland
People from Castlederg
People educated at Omagh Academy
Councillors in County Tyrone